The Nikitin MU-4 was an amphibian trainer aircraft produced in the USSR in 1936.

Development
The flying boat style MU-4 training amphibian was a single-engined side-by-side two-seat biplane. The single engine was supported in front of the upper mainplane by a short nacelle and the cabane struts of the wing. The upper wing was supported on dural interplane and cabane struts which were braced with flying and landing wires. Built predominantly of wood the wings and strut braced tail surfaces were part plywood and part fabric covered, whilst the fuselage was built up from wooden frames and plywood skinning. The manually retractable Ski/wheel undercarriage was attached either side of the fuselage forward of the wings. Flight testing was carried out successfully, demonstrating good flying qualities and adequate performance, however after prolonged testing the aircraft crashed due to a glue failure

Specifications (MU-4)

See also

References

 Gunston, Bill. "Encyclopedia of Russian Aircraft 1875-1995". London:Osprey. 1995.

External links
 https://web.archive.org/web/19991004085143/http://www.aviation.ru/Nikitin/

1930s Soviet military trainer aircraft
MU-4
Flying boats
Amphibious aircraft
Sesquiplanes
Single-engined tractor aircraft
Aircraft first flown in 1936